Wanted sa Radyo is a public affairs show that airs on Monday to Friday from 2:00 to 4:00 pm (PST) on 92.3 Radyo5 True FM (DWFM) with simulcast on television via One PH and online via livestreaming on the "Raffy Tulfo in Action" YouTube channel and Facebook page. It also replays on Tuesday to Friday from 2:30 to 4:30 am, Saturdays from 2:00 to 4:00 pm and Sundays from 2:00 to 4:00 am on One PH. It is hosted by Senator Raffy Tulfo, alongside Sharee Roman. Whenever Tulfo is absent from the show mostly due to his duties as a senator, he is filled in by his daughter Maricel Tulfo-Tungol, his son-in-law Atty. Gareth Tungol, his son-in-law's father Atty. Danilo Tungol, Atty. Blessie Abad, Atty. Gabriel Ilaya, Atty. Ina Magpale, Atty. Gail Dela Cruz, Atty. Joren Tan, Aanaan Singh, Marsh Salcedo or Atty. Sam Ferrer.

History
Wanted sa Radyo first aired on DZXL-AM from 1994 to 2011. It transferred to the newly-launched Radyo5 92.3 News FM in 2011, while retaining Raffy Tulfo and Niña Taduran as its hosts with the same airtime from 2:00 pm to 4:00 pm.

Its television simulcast began on February 21, 2011 with the launch of AksyonTV. From January to May 2012, the show used to temporarily air for one hour from 12:30 pm to 1:30 pm whenever Radyo5 and AksyonTV aired the News5 coverage of the impeachment trial of then-Chief Justice Renato Corona at 1:30 pm onwards. On December 23, 2013, the Radyo5 studios used by the show moved from the TV5 Studio Complex in Novaliches, Quezon City to TV5 Media Center in Mandaluyong.

On October 15, 2018, Niña Taduran left the show to run for party-list representative for ACT-CIS in 2019. She was replaced by Sharee Roman. The TV simulcast was carried over to One PH in January 2019, when AksyonTV was rebranded as 5 Plus.

From October 18, 2021, the show moved from TV5 Media Center to its new studio at the Raffy Tulfo Action Center in Quezon City and it went online-only where it is exclusively livestreamed on "Raffy Tulfo in Action" YouTube channel. Replay episodes were being aired until October 20, 2021, on their regular timeslot on Radyo5 92.3 News FM and One PH before live broadcasts resumed on the next day. An online-only hour-long extended edition of the show was also launched on the same day.

On February 8, 2022, Tulfo took a leave from the show to focus on his Senate campaign; he returned to the show on May 10. The show still continues streaming online even if Radyo5 and One PH air a One News special coverage.

On August 12, 2022, Tulfo revealed that the show would return to the TV5 Media Center starting August 15. As a result, it reverted to its regular two-hour timeslot. The hour-long online-exclusive extended edition was moved to 6:00–7:00 pm, this time re-titled as RTIA: Bardagulan Serye with Roman and Tulfo-Tungol as hosts; it later returned airing from 4:00–5:00 pm.

Format
The show investigates and exposes cases of abuse, dishonesty, exploitation, and family disputes ("Sumbong at Aksyon"), as well as recognizes ordinary people who return items of value that they find in their course of work ("Solian ng Bayan"). The show regularly emphasizes Tulfo's no-nonsense approach and interrogation, sometimes laced with profanity.

The most common feature of the show is "Sumbong at Aksyon", where complainants tell Tulfo about their situation and seek assistance to resolve it. Tulfo puts the other party on the air to get their side of the story and encourages both parties to talk to each other in the air. Tulfo may occasionally conclude that the complainant is the one who committed something wrong and, as such, may refuse further assistance; in rare cases, Tulfo himself may even take action against the complainant (e.g. refer him/her to the police and file charges) if warranted. After hearing both sides of the story, Tulfo may contact someone in a position (e.g. high-ranking police officials or social workers) to further assist the aggrieved party. An average of four sets of complainants are featured during the show. If a complainant's conversation with the other party is quite lengthy and time is about to run out, they may be asked to continue it off-air.

The final show of each month begins with an awarding ceremony featuring people who returned items to their owners in the "Solian ng Bayan" segments aired throughout the month. The awardees receive a medal, plaque, cash reward, and items from the sponsors; these are in addition to the cash reward and items received during the "Solian ng Bayan" segment in which they appeared.

Internet and social media

On July 4, 2016, Wanted sa Radyo launched a website entitled "Raffy Tulfo in Action", which features the cases featured in WSR and also cases in the spin-off segment Itimbre Mo kay Tulfo on Aksyon sa Tanghali and Idol in Action. The show's video feed is simulcast over Radyo5's Facebook page and a copy of the day's show is also posted on the "Raffy Tulfo in Action" YouTube channel. The social media accounts contain video clips that feature how some of the cases were resolved as well as how the off-air conversations between the parties have gone.

Wanted sa Radyo segments
"Accomplishment Report" - about Wanteds cases that went through successfully.
"Aksyon sa Text" - complaints and actions that came from texters/callers.
"Huwarang Pulis" - a monthly segment honoring honest policemen.
"Sumbong at Aksyon" - a segment featuring walk-in complaints and on-the-spot solutions.
"Solian ng Bayan" - a segment where lost items are returned by finders. The rule is that if the lost items remain unclaimed by the end of 1 month, they can be kept by finders. And every month, they honor chosen honest finders, giving them plaques and additional rewards.
"Wanted Update" - Wanteds cases that are still ongoing.
"Wanted Netizens" - posts by netizens who reacted accordingly.

Hosts

Current
 Raffy Tulfo 
 Sharee Roman

Substitute hosts
 Atty. Gareth Tungol 
 Atty. Danilo Tungol 
 Atty. Blessie Abad 
 Atty. Gabriel Ilaya 
 Atty. Ina Magpale 
 Atty. Gail Dela Cruz 
 Atty. Sam Ferrer 
 Atty. Joren Tan 
 Aanaan Singh 
 Marsh Salcedo 
 Maricel Tulfo-Tungol

Former
 Niña Taduran

Wanted reporters

Current
 Carol Domingo
 Odette Molina
 Sharee Roman
 Maureen Peralta
 Jam Cordero
 Klein Biete

Former
 Jana Abrigo
 Benjamin Dela Cruz
 Alyssa Dosal
 Jill Nebrida
 Leslie Ordinario
 Yeddha Pascual (now a mobile journalist for One PH)

Spin-off television series
From January 28, 2011 to July 30, 2012, Wanted, a public affairs program acting as an extension and TV version of Wanted sa Radyo, was aired every Monday at 11:30pm–12:00am on TV5. AksyonTV aired its producer's cut from February 21, 2011 to January 11, 2019. The set was different, with Tulfo sitting comfortably in a radio booth setting. Respondents and interviewees are videotaped while they are on the phone with him. From June 8, 2020 to October 1, 2021, it was renamed Idol in Action.

Wanted: Ang Serye, a docu-drama anthology and another extension of Wanted, premiered on January 16, 2021 on TV5. Presented by Cignal Entertainment and JCB Entertainment Productions, it is also hosted by Tulfo. The program dramatizes true stories based on complaints brought to Raffy Tulfo in Action. After its most recent episode was aired on May 1, 2021, it took a "season break". It returned on June 27 in a new timeslot.

Controversies

Jee Ick-Joo's abduction and killing

On October 21, 2016, a complainant named alias "Joy" was exulted to WSR that her employee South Korean businessman named Jee Ick-Joo was kidnapped by a policeman identified as SPO3 Richard "Ricky" Sta. Isabel, due to alleged involvement of illegal drugs on 18 October in Angeles, Pampanga, the maid ang Jee was sent to Quezon City and eventually separated at Camp Crame, and that night when they separated Jee was killed in nearby White House, the residence of the Philippine National Police Chief, incidentally Gen. Ronald dela Rosa was in Beijing accompanied by President Rodrigo Duterte on his State Visit.

Political involvement

Raffy Tulfo and his siblings are staunch supporters of President Rodrigo Duterte's policies. During the 2019 elections, he and Erwin acquired ACT-CIS Partylist from former Representative Samuel Pagdilao, Jr. and nominated Erwin's Chief of Staff Eric Go Yap, Raffy's wife Jocelyn Tulfo, and co-host Niña Taduran, while Ramon, Wanda, and Ben declined to participate. ACT-CIS took the top position with 2.6 million votes, earning the maximum of three seats at the 18th Congress. One of the campaign strategies is inserting the ACT-CIS logo to the Raffy Tulfo in Action social media pages, as RTIA is only a blocktimer to 92.3 True FM Radyo5.

References

External links
Raffy Tulfo in Action
 
 

TV5 (Philippine TV network) original programming
One PH original programming
Philippine radio programs
Philippine reality television series
2020s Philippine television series
2011 Philippine television series debuts
1994 radio programme debuts
Filipino-language television shows
Simulcasts